Zamia roezlii is a species of cycad, a palm-like pachycaulous plant in the family Zamiaceae. It is found in Colombia (Choco, Nariño, Valle del Cauca, and Amazonas departments) and the Pacific coast of Ecuador. It is named for the Czech botanist Benedikt Roezl. A single sperm cell from Zamia roezlii is about 0.4mm in length and is visible to the unaided eye, being the world's largest plant sperm cell. Drosophila bifurca, a species of fruit fly, has sperm that are 5.8cm long, albeit mostly coiled tail. The tree is up to 22 feet (seven meters) in height with fronds up to ten feet (three meters) long bearing leaflets up to  twenty inches (fifty centimeters) long and six inches (fifteen cm) wide.>

References

 https://web.archive.org/web/20101117213708/http://waynesword.palomar.edu:80/ww0601.htm#sperm

roezlii
Flora of Ecuador
Flora of Colombia
Near threatened plants
Taxonomy articles created by Polbot